The Brazilian Social Democracy Party (PSDB), also known as the Brazilian Social Democratic Party or the Party of Brazilian Social Democracy, is a political party in Brazil. As the third largest party in the National Congress, the PSDB was the main opposition party against the Workers' Party (PT) administrations of Luiz Inácio Lula da Silva and Dilma Rousseff from 2003 to 2016.

Born together as part of the social democratic opposition to the military dictatorship from the late 1970s through the 1980s, the PSDB and the PT have since the mid-1990s been the bitterest of rivals in current Brazilian politics—both parties prohibit any kind of coalition or official cooperation with each other at any government levels. The PSDB's mascot is a blue and yellow colored toucan, with party members being called tucanos for this reason. Famous tucanos include Mário Covas, Geraldo Alckmin, Tasso Jereissati, Aécio Neves, former President Fernando Henrique Cardoso, Franco Montoro, Aloysio Nunes, Yeda Crusius, João Doria, and José Serra.

History 

With the imminent collapse of the military dictatorship in the early 1980s, a group of left-wing intellectuals were mobilized to create a leftist party. Some of them attempted to work with the labour movement led by Luiz Inacio Lula da Silva, but the group split over ideological grounds. A group of democratic socialists and Trotskyists joined the labour movement and founded the Workers' Party (PT) while the social democrats remained in the Brazilian Democratic Movement Party (PMDB) and would later create the Brazilian Social Democracy Party. Founded on 25 June 1988 by members of the Brazilian Democratic Movement Party (PMDB) linked to the European social democratic movement as an attempt to clarify their ideals, its manifesto preached "democracy as a fundamental value" and "social justice as an aim to be reached". In its foundation, the party attempted to unite political groups as diverse as social democrats, social liberals, Christian democrats and democratic socialists. The period when the PSDB was created was a very significant moment in the history of Brazilian politics.

On 21 April 1985, President-elect Tancredo Neves died, having been the last President not elected directly by the people since the beginning of the military dictatorship. With the formation of new parties, including the PSDB, a National Constitutional Assembly was created and drafted the current democratic constitution in 1988. A high proportion of the first members of the PSDB came from the so-called "historic PMDB", which was and still is a very large party with many internal conflicts. The founders of the PSDB were dissatisfied with the results of the National Constitutional Assembly and decided to create a party to reflect the need for a national political renewal. As their manifesto states, the new party was created "away from the official benefits, but close to the pulsing of the streets" (taken from a speech by party leader Franco Montoro). Some of the founding members were José Serra, Mário Covas, Ciro Gomes, André Franco Montoro, Fernando Henrique Cardoso, Aécio Neves and Geraldo Alckmin.

In a country where two constitutional referendums, held in 1963 and in 1993, have shown a very strong preference for a presidential system of government as in most countries of the Americas, the PSDB stands almost alone in the preference given in its manifesto to a parliamentarian system of government. However, after the electors rejected parliamentarism in 1993 and even though the PSDB leader Cardoso was elected President the next year, the party did nothing in subsequent years to further the cause of a parliamentarian system.

The PSDB is one of the largest and most significant political parties in Brazil. Its official program says its policies are social democratic and often associated with the Third Way movement, although the party is also seen as influenced by neoliberalism. The party's program states that it "reject[s] populism and authoritarianism, as well as both fundamentalist neoliberalism and obsolete national-statism".

Despite its name, the PSDB is not a member of the Socialist International which draws together social democratic parties worldwide (the Brazilian member of the Socialist International is the Democratic Labour Party, PDT). The party has never had the links to trade union movements that usually characterize social democratic parties; it used to sponsor a central union, the Social-Democracia Sindical (SDS), which has now merged with the Central Autônoma dos Trabalhadores (CAT) and the much more important Central Geral dos Trabalhadores (CGT) into the União Geral dos Trabalhadores (UGT), but its impact among the unions has always been quite unimpressive compared to even much smaller parties as the PDT or the Communist Party of Brazil, or to the tucanoss own influence in society at large.

After supporting the candidacy of Geraldo Alckmin in the 2018 presidential election (which was eliminated in the first round with 4.8 per cent of the vote), in the second round, some of the party's leaders supported the far-right candidate Jair Bolsonaro, to whom most of the party's traditional electorate had already turned, while former São Paulo Governor Alberto Goldman endorsed Workers’ Party candidate Fernando Haddad instead.

Recent times 
A mere six years after its creation, the PSDB won the presidency. It grew faster than any other party in Brazilian history, with an astonishingly good performance in elections at all levels. President Cardoso enjoyed eight years (1994–2002) of political stability in his tenure as President, with achievement toward these tenets of PSDB's stated program:
 Constant defense of democracy
 Keeping the state at a minimally needed size
 Administrative decentralization
 Sustainable economic growth with wealth distribution
 Political reform to make stronger parties with electoral district representatives more accountable as well as aiming to reduce and eliminate corruption
After suffering defeats in the 2016 and 2018 elections, PSDB went through a rebranding. The font of their logo was changed, the Toucan was removed in favor of a flag of Brazil and the party received a new motto Pelo Brasil ("For Brazil").

Controversies

Ranking of corruption 
Based on data released by the Superior Electoral Court, the Movement to Combat Electoral Corruption released a ranking on 4 October 2007 regarding the parties that included the largest number of elected officials exposed for corruption since 2000. The PSDB appeared in third place on the list with 58 cases, behind only the Democrats and the PMDB.

The PSDB was considered Brazil's "dirtiest" party by the country’s electoral authority. Yet, according to a 2016 academic study, the party has clearly benefited from the complacency of the Brazilian media, which has barely mentioned these cases.

According to an analysis released on 8 September 2012, of 317 Brazilian politicians who were barred from running in elections by the Clean Record Act, the PSDB is the party that has the largest number of barred candidates with 56 party members.

A Privataria Tucana 
The 2011 book A Privataria Tucana, written by journalist Amaury Ribeiro Jr., a former special reporter of weekly magazine ISTO É and daily newspaper O Globo, highlighted documents that show alleged irregularities in privatizations that occurred during the administration of the former President Fernando Henrique Cardoso. It contains about 140 pages of photocopied documents in support of the claim that President Cardoso's Minister of Planning and later Minister of Health José Serra received kickbacks from businessmen who participated in the Brazilian privatization process, held companies in tax shelters, and moved millions of dollars between 1993 and 2003.

Ideology 
Although the PSDB declares itself as a centrist party, some people on the left reject this definition, especially after Fernando Henrique Cardoso embraced Third Way politics as President. The party has been seen as neoliberal by critics from its beginnings. Luiz Carlos Bresser-Pereira, one of the founders of the PSDB, left the party for ideological reasons, claiming "that the party had taken a hard turn to the right".

In an article titled "The left-right confusion in the post-Berlin Wall world", political analyst Angelo Segrillo says that "most analysts defined PSDB as center-left as of its foundation, after all, it was the Brazilian Social Democratic Party". As he notes, "this story changed after 1994, with the election of PSDB to the presidency. [...] A rhetoric of overcoming classical ideological division [...] was one of the justifications of the grand parliamentary alliance with center and right-wing parties. [...] As such, after the 1994 presidential election, most analysts started defining PSDB as a center party along with PMDB". In its 2009 report about Freedom in the World, Freedom House defined the opposition coalition (formed by PSDB, PPS and Democrats) as a "center-right coalition". However, in the 2010 report by the same organization, PSDB was defined as a "center-left" party.

Political scientist Glauco Peres notes that the party's move toward conservatism came "in stages," from "the liberal policies and major privatizations of the Cardoso era" to the gradual emergence of a "conservative and religious discourse" in the early 2010s to the failed campaign of the party's right-wing presidential candidate Aecio Neves in 2014.

Workers' Party campaign leader Marco Aurélio Garcia criticized declarations made by PSDB president Sérgio Guerra that PSDB is "the real left". He said that "PSDB is not a right wing party, it is the right wing's party".

Political alignment 
The PSDB questions the use of what it considers "outdated political labels" such as "left" and "right". To quote a document drafted by Fernando Henrique Cardoso's office in 1990: "If left means to be against the existing social order, and right in favor, then social-democracy is without doubt a left current. [...] A social democrat is before anything else someone who has critical sense — who realizes the injustices of society and has no fear to oppose them, even at the risk of being taken as a subversive or a dreamer".

The party did not preach nationalization or privatization in general ("the consensus is that the state must not be too big or too small, but 'have the size and functions corresponding to the needs of the whole of society'"), yet President Cardoso privatized many large public companies, such as Companhia Vale do Rio Doce and the national telecommunication system. Many political scientists in Brazil believed that the party in its antagonism with the PT made a move to the right in recent years to fill a void in the Brazilian political spectrum and to put a certain distance between itself and the PT's political views, which also moved more to the right (from the far-left or left to the centre-left) in the 1990s in order to be elected.

Voter base 
The main electoral base of the party is the State of São Paulo, where the party triumphed in all but three major elections to executive office. The party also has a stronghold in other regions which reject the PT, like Espirito Santo, and in some southern and mid-western states. Unlike the PT, the party has more success in more local elections in the same areas that often vote for the PT in national elections, like the North and Northeastern regions and Minas Gerais. Many leaders of the party come from these regions, like Tasso Jereisatti, Aécio Neves, Teotonio Vilela Filho, Cassio Cunha Lima, Sergio Guerra and Simão Jatene. However, the party has not succeeded in transforming this into results in presidential elections, partly because of Luiz Inácio Lula da Silva's charisma and partly because of internal infighting.

Most rejection of the party comes from the State of Rio de Janeiro, where the positioning of the party in the Brazilian centre and centre-right often loses to PMDB and another parties with less national representation, like the Brazilian Republican Party, the Democrats, Progressistas and the Social Christian Party. The only victory of the party in Rio occurred in 1994, when the majority of voters in the state supported FHC in the presidential election and the toucans Artur da Tavola and Marcello Alencar were elected to the senate and state governorship, respectively. PT is also strongly rejected in Rio, however less than PSDB.

Despite being considered a centre-left party by their own members, media and by the Brazilian right, the PSDB has little or no appeal to the majority of Brazilian left. The majority of support and bases of tucanos comes from right-wing sectors like conservative Christians, professionals, the middle and upper middle class, farmers, landowners and business owners. Reasons for this support derive from the more moderate rhetoric and ideology of the party compared with the PT, the major economic reforms which the party led in the 1990s, and the major influence of the Democrats in the party.

This support is not viewed well inside the "old guard" of the party. Many tucanos often publicly express their discomfort with the party. Even Cardoso, the most successful figure in the party's history, constantly criticizes such PSDB politicians as Colonel Telhada, a former police officer who was elected a deputy in São Paulo with proposals such as reducing the age of defense of infancy, harsher penalties for criminals and appealing to the evangelical churches, of which Telhada is a member; and João Dória Junior, mayor of São Paulo between 2016 and 2018 and governor of the state of São Paulo since 2019. Dória is often accused of populism, demagoguery, opportunism, personalism, self-promotion, market fundamentalism and aggressive exploitation of anti-Workers' Party sentiment within the populace. These antagonisms persist between the voter base together with the new members who joined the party based on right-wing sentiment of opposition to the Workers' Party versus the party elite and older members with more left-liberal, progressive, social democratic and pragmatic views, thus an important factor in the often internal rifts between tucanos.

In 2017, a group of new, young federal representatives, nicknamed "black heads", in reference to their youth (contrasting the gray or bald heads of older and progressive members), began to gain prominence in the party. This wing, made up of members in their 30s or younger, has shown strong opposition to support of the party for the government of President Michel Temer and a far more support for economic liberalism than the old party members like José Serra and Aloysio Nunes. Black heads now occupy important positions inside the party and with support of the base and social movements like the Free Brazil Movement have the capacity to push the party more to the right-wing of the Brazilian political spectrum.

In the 2018 general election, the party suffered the greatest defeat in its history as Geraldo Alckmin came in fourth in the presidential election with less than 5% of votes and the party fell to 10th position in number of representatives in the Chamber of Deputies, with fewer representatives than the Democrats. The key reasons for this failure were the corruption scandals of Aécio Neves, the party's support for the government of Michel Temer, the lack of charisma and wrong strategies of Alckmin in the presidential campaign, which chose to attack the right-wing populist candidate Jair Bolsonaro from a progressive viewpoint instead of attacking the traditional rival PT, and a continuing domination of old leftist leaders instead of new and more liberal members with stronger connection with the voter base over the party. They support Bolsonaro and his Social Liberal Party smashed the voter base of the party. The PSDB faced a runoff in three of the four biggest states, namely São Paulo, Minas Gerais and Rio Grande do Sul, all of them with more pro-free market and centre-right views than Alckmin. PSDB triumphed in São Paulo with João Doria Junior, Rio Grande do Sul with Eduardo Leite and in the agrarian state of Mato Grosso do Sul with Reinaldo Azambuja, also a centre-right candidate.

According to researcher Christophe Ventura, the party's candidates are often evangelicals, multimillionaires and entrepreneurs. They present themselves as "managers" rather than "politicians".

Party Leadership

List of party presidents

Honor Presidents

Prominent members and former members

President and candidates
 Fernando Henrique Cardoso, former President of Brazil
 José Serra, current senator for São Paulo, former Minister of Health, Minister of Foreign Affairs and presidential candidate for 2002 and 2010
 Aécio Neves, former party president, current federal deputy for Minas Gerais, former senator for Minas Gerais and presidential candidate for 2014
 João Doria, former governor of São Paulo and former presidential candidate for 2022
 Geraldo Alckmin, former governor of São Paulo and presidential candidate for 2006 and 2018, former member

Governors and Senators
 Tasso Jereissati, former party president and current senator for Ceara
 Plínio Valério, current senator for Amazonas
 Izalci Lucas, current senator for the Federal District
 Mara Gabrilli, current senator for São Paulo and candidate for vice president in 2022, former member
 Alessandro Vieira, current senator for Sergipe
 José Serra, current Senator for São Paulo
 Reinaldo Azambuja, former governor of Mato Grosso do Sul
 Ranolfo Vieira Júnior, former governor of Rio Grande do Sul
 Rodrigo Garcia, former governor of São Paulo
 , current vice governor of Amazonas 
 Paulo Brant, current vice governor of Minas Gerais

Mayors and Deputies
 Adolfo Viana, current federal deputy for Bahia and party floor leader at the Chamber of Deputies
 Geovania de Sá, current federal deputy for Santa Catarina and third secretary of the Chamber of Deputies
 Aécio Neves, current federal deputy for Minas Gerais and chairman of the Committee for External Relations and National Defence
 Álvaro Dias, current mayor of Natal
 Cinthia Ribeiro, current mayor of Palmas
 Hildon Chaves, current mayor of Porto Velho
 Maurício Carvalho, current vice mayor of Porto Velho

Electoral history

Presidential elections

Legislative elections

Municipal elections

References

External links 
  
 Official website of Institute of Political studies of the party 

Political parties established in 1988
Neoliberal parties
Centrist parties in Brazil
Christian democratic parties in South America
Liberal parties in Brazil
Social liberal parties
1988 establishments in Brazil